Whitesmiths Ltd. was a software company founded in New York City by P. J. Plauger, Mark Krieger and Gabriel Pham, and last located in Westford, Massachusetts. It sold a Unix-like operating system called Idris, as well as the first commercial C compiler, Whitesmiths C.

The Whitesmiths compiler, first written for the PDP-11, was released in 1978 and compiled a version of C similar to that accepted by Version 6 Unix (Dennis Ritchie's original C compiler). It was an entirely new implementation, borrowing no code from Unix. Today, it is mainly remembered for lending its name to a particular indentation style, originally used in the code examples which accompanied it. Whitesmith's first customer for their C compiler was Fischer & Porter, a process control company then located in Warminster, Pennsylvania. Besides PDP-11, the compiler had code generators for Intel 8080/Zilog Z80, Motorola MC68000, and VAX-11, and it was commonly used as a cross compiler. Whitesmiths also developed a Pascal front-end for the compiler, that emitted C-language code for input to the C compiler.

By 1983 Whitesmiths was one of several vendors of Unix-like operating systems. That year Whitesmiths formed a technical and business alliance with France-based COSMIC Software. At that time, Whitesmiths published 16-bit compilers for machines like PDP-11 while COSMIC published 8-bit compilers for Intel and Motorola CPUs. This technology alliance improved compilers for both markets. Whitesmiths was actively involved in developing the original ANSI C standard supplying several members to the standards committee and hosting some technical sessions. They were one of the first suppliers of an ANSI C compliant compiler.

The company's president from 1978 to 1988 was P. J. Plauger. Whitesmiths merged with Intermetrics in December 1988, leading to further mergers and acquisitions.

References

External links 
 Whitesmiths Ltd. C Programmers' Manual
 Official homepage of Cosmic Software

Defunct software companies of the United States
Unix history